The Toronto Attack was a junior ice hockey team based in Toronto, Ontario, Canada. It played in the Greater Metro Junior A Hockey League (GMHL).

History
The Attack was announced as an expansion team on March 19, 2012, by the GMHL. On September 15, 2012, it played its first game, in Thornhill, Ontario, against the Toronto Canada Moose, where it picked up its first victory 10–2. Andrew Magee scored the first goal in team history 4:09 into the first period. Caydon Edwards made 23 saves in the win.  On September 18, it played its first home game, against the Moose, and won 9–7.

The team ceased operations after the 2016–17 season.

Season-by-season standings

References

External links
Attack Webpage
GMHL Webpage

2012 establishments in Ontario
Ice hockey clubs established in 2012
Ice hockey teams in Toronto
Defunct ice hockey teams in Canada
Ice hockey clubs disestablished in 2017
2017 disestablishments in Ontario